Joachim Sauter (16 May 1959 – 10 July 2021) was a German media artist, designer and technology entrepreneur. He was appointed Professor for New Media Art and Design at the Universität der Künste Berlin, UdK (Berlin University of the Arts) in 1991, and in 1993 he created Terravision (computer program), before pursuing a lawsuit against Google for infringing the patent. He became an adjunct professor at UCLA, Los Angeles in 2001.

Early life and education
Sauter studied design at the UdK Berlin, and direction and camera at the German Academy for Film and Television, Berlin. He was using computers both as a tool and as a medium since the early stages of his work. A pioneer of new media, he developed and shaped the field from the early 1980s on.

Career
In 1988, he founded the new media design studio ART+COM with other designers, architects, technologists, and other artists and scientists. Their goal was to research the new medium in the realms of art and design, emphasizing the translation of information (easily transmissible via new media) into physical spaces, offering a more communal, reality-grounded experience than could be achieved with computer monitors alone. As Head of Design at ART+COM, Sauter led the interdisciplinary group’s innovative experiments, using new technologies to convey complex topics while exploring their potential for spatial communication and art.

Personal life and death
Sauter was married and had a son. He died on 10 July 2021 following a serious illness.

Projects with ART+COM (partial)
Art:

 2018 "Petalclouds" – kinetic installation
 2018 "Raffaels Pendulum" – kinetic installation
 2017 "Chronos XXI" – kinetic installation

2013 "Symphonie Cinétique – The Poetry of Motion" – exhibition and performance in collaboration with Ólafur Arnalds
2013 "Ink Drops to the Origin" — interactive installation
2012 "Kinetic Rain" – kinetic installation
2008 "Kinetic Sculpture" – kinetic sculpture
2007 "Duality" – interactive environmental installation, Tokyo
2002 "Behind the Lines"  – interactive installation
1999–2002 "The Jew of Malta" – medial stage
1995–2008 "The Invisible Shapes of Things Past" – architectural sculptures made of films
1992 "De-Viewer" – interactive installation

Design:
2008 "Spheres" – mediatecture
2005 "documenta mobil" – mobile exhibition
2004 "floating.numbers" – interactive table installation
2004 "Austrian Flag" – interactive flag
1995– ? "timescope" – low-tech augmented reality device
1994 "Terravision" – interactive installation showing a virtual representation of the Earth using satellite imagery, commissioned in 1994 by Deutsche Telekom

Exhibitions (partial)
2013 "LeBains", Paris, France
2011 "Matter Light II", Borusan Center for Culture and Arts, Istanbul, Turkey
2010 "moving spaces", Alva Aalto Museum, Aalborg, Denmark
2008 "on cities", National Architecture Museum Stockholm, Sweden
2007 “From Sparc to Pixel”, Martin Gropius Bau, Berlin, Germany
2006 “Venice Biennale of Architecture”, German Pavilion, Italy
2006 “Shanghai Biennale", China
2006 “Digital Transit”, ARCO, Madrid, Spain
2005 "São Paulo Biennale of Architecture", Brasil
2004 “Navigator”, National Museum of Fine Arts, Taichung, Taiwan
2003 “Future Cinema”, ZKM, Karlsruhe, Germany/Lille, France
2001 “Invisible”, Museum of Contemporary Art, Porto, Portugal
1998 “Portable Sacred Grounds”, ICC, Tokyo, Japan
1996 “Wunschmaschine, Welterfindung”, Kunsthalle Wien, Austria
1996 “Under the Capricorn”, Stedelijk Museum, Amsterdam, Netherlands
1995 “Anew Europe”, Venice Biennale, Italy
1993 “Artec”, Museum of Modern Art, Nagoya, Japan
1992 “Manifeste”, Centre Pompidou, Paris, France

See also
Installation art

References

External links

Joachim Sauter’s Website
Interview at The Creators Project
Interview at Gestalten TV
Interview at ARTE Creative 

German artists
1959 births
2021 deaths
Berlin University of the Arts alumni
People from Schwäbisch Gmünd